This is a list of works (films, television, shorts etc.) by the Japanese animation studio Studio Ghibli.

Works

Feature films 

  Not produced, but released by Studio Ghibli under its label.

Anime television series

Short films 
These are short films, including those created for television, theatrical release, and the Ghibli Museum. Original video animation releases and music videos (theatrical and television) are also listed in this section.

Commercials

Video games

Stage productions 
 Princess Mononoke (2013)
 Spirited Away (2022)
 My Neighbour Totoro (2022)

Other works 
The works listed here consist of works that do not fall into the above categories. All of these films have been released on DVD or Blu-ray in Japan as part of the Ghibli Gakujutsu Library.

Exhibitions 
A selection of layout designs for animated productions was exhibited in the Studio Ghibli Layout Designs: Understanding the Secrets of Takahata and Miyazaki Animation exhibition tour, which started in the Museum of Contemporary Art Tokyo (July 28, 2008 to September 28, 2008) and subsequently travelled to different museums throughout Japan and Asia, concluding its tour of Japan in the Fukuoka Asian Art Museum (October 12, 2013 to January 26, 2014) and its tour of Asia in the Hong Kong Heritage Museum (May 14, 2014 to August 31, 2014). Between October 4, 2014 and March 1, 2015 the layout designs were exhibited at Art Ludique in Paris. The exhibition catalogues contain annotated reproductions of the displayed artwork.

Related works 
These works were not created by Studio Ghibli, but were produced by a variety of studios and people who went on to form or join Studio Ghibli. This includes members of Topcraft that went on to create Studio Ghibli in 1985; works produced by Toei Animation, TMS Entertainment, Nippon Animation or other studios and featuring involvement by Hayao Miyazaki, Isao Takahata or other Ghibli staffers. The list also includes works created in cooperation with Studio Ghibli.

Pre-Ghibli

Cooperative works

Distributive works 
These Western animated films (plus one Japanese film) have been distributed by Studio Ghibli, and now through their label, Ghibli Museum Library.

Contributive works 
Studio Ghibli has made contributions to the following anime series and movies:

Significant achievements 
 The highest-grossing film of 1989 in Japan: Kiki's Delivery Service
 The highest-grossing film of 1991 in Japan: Only Yesterday
 The highest-grossing film of 1992 in Japan: Porco Rosso
 The highest-grossing film of 1994 in Japan: Pom Poko
 The highest-grossing film of 1995 in Japan; the first Japanese film in Dolby Digital: Whisper of the Heart
 The highest-grossing film of 2002 in Japan: Spirited Away
 The highest-grossing film of 2008 in Japan: Ponyo
 The highest-grossing Japanese film of 2010 in Japan: The Secret World of Arrietty
 The highest-grossing film of 2013 in Japan: The Wind Rises
 The first Studio Ghibli film to use computer graphics: Pom Poko
 The first Miyazaki feature to use computer graphics, and the first Studio Ghibli film to use digital coloring; the first animated feature in Japan's history to gross more than 10 billion yen at the box office and the first animated film ever to win a National Academy Award for Best Picture of the Year: Princess Mononoke
 The first Studio Ghibli film to be shot using a 100% digital process: My Neighbors the Yamadas
 The first Miyazaki feature to be shot using a 100% digital process; the first film to gross $200 million worldwide before opening in North America; the film to finally overtake Titanic at the Japanese box office, becoming the top-grossing film in the history of Japanese cinema; the only anime and traditionally animated winner, so far, of an Academy award for Best Animated Feature: Spirited Away

References 

 
Studio Ghibli